Sieraków is a village in the administrative district of Gmina Harasiuki, within Nisko County, Subcarpathian Voivodeship, in south-eastern Poland.

The village has an approximate population of 300.

References

Villages in Nisko County